Anopina guerrerana is a moth of the family Tortricidae. It is found in Guerrero, Mexico.

The length of the forewings is about 7 mm. The forewings are cream white, although the extreme base is chestnut brown, outlined obliquely from the costa to the base of the dorsum. The hindwings are cream white (paler than the forewings) and slightly greyish externally.

References

Moths described in 1962
guerrerana
Moths of Central America